The 2015 ITU World Triathlon Series is a series of ten World Championship Triathlon events that lead up to a Grand Final held in Chicago. The Series is organised under the auspices of the world governing body of triathlon, the International Triathlon Union (ITU).

Calendar
The 2015 series visited ten cities around the world.

Results

Medal summary

Men

Women 

Rankings : http://wts.triathlon.org/rankings/

Overall standings
The athlete who accumulates the most points throughout the 8 race season is declared the year's world champion. The final point standings are:

Men

Women

References

2015
World Triathlon Series
International sports competitions hosted by the United States
Triathlon competitions in the United States
2015 in American sports